Mbava (also called Baga) is an island in Solomon Islands, lying just west of Vella Lavella.

It is located in the New Georgia Islands Group, in the Western Province.

Islands of the Solomon Islands
Western Province (Solomon Islands)